Simulium tuberosum, known generally as Twinn's black fly, is a species of black fly in the family Simuliidae. Other common names include the superfluous black fly and tubercled black fly.

References

tuberosum
Articles created by Qbugbot
Insects described in 1911